An Intimate Evening with Anne Murray is a live album by Canadian Country artist Anne Murray. It was released by Capitol Records on September 16, 1997. The album peaked at number 8 on the RPM Country Albums chart.

Track listing

DVD

Chart performance

References

1997 live albums
Anne Murray albums
Capitol Records live albums